Caples may refer to:

People
Garrett Caples (b. 1972), American poet
Harry Caples (1896 - 1933), Australian representative rugby league footballer
Yvonne Caples (b. 1972), women's boxing champion

Place name
Caples, Washington, United States

See also
Caple, a surname